Joseph Gregory Dwenger C.P.P.S (April 7, 1837 – January 22, 1893) was an American prelate of the Roman Catholic Church.  He served as bishop of the Diocese of Fort Wayne in Indiana from 1872 to 1893.

Biography

Early life 
Joseph Dwenger was born near Minster, Ohio, on April 7, 1837. His parents were Johann Gerhard Heinrich "Henry" Dwenger and  Maria Catherine Wirdt. Dying of cholera, his widowed mother entrusted the boy to Fr. Andrew Kunkler. Joseph was raised  by the Missionaries of the Precious Blood and educated at Holy Trinity School in Cincinnati He later joined the community, and was sent to Mount St. Mary's Seminary in Cincinnati.

Priesthood 
Dwenger was ordained a priest for the Missionaries of the Precious Blood by Archbishop John Baptist Purcell on September 4, 1859.  He had received a papal dispensation to receive ordination at age 22. In 1861, he arranged for the purchase of the property where St. Charles Seminary would eventually be located and was its founding rector. In 1862, he was assigned to parochial work. From 1867 to 1872, he was occupied in preaching missions in Ohio, Indiana and Kentucky.  In 1872, Dwenger accompanied Purcell as his theologian to the Second Plenary Council of American bishops in Baltimore, Maryland.

Bishop of Fort Wayne 
On February 15, 1872, Pope Pius IX appointed Dwenger as bishop of the Diocese of Fort Wayne.  He was consecrated by Purcell on April 14, 1872, in Cincinnati. In 1874, Dwenger joined other American bishops in a pilgrimage to Europe.

During his time in office he supported the congregation of the Poor Handmaids of Jesus Christ, as had his predecessor Bishop John Henry Luers. He allowed Father Edward Koenig – who had served as advisor to the sisters since their arrival – to remain in office in their Motherhouse in Fort Wayne. The good relationship continued, and in due course the congregation opened many schools, orphanages and hospitals in his and the neighbouring dioceses. Especially the establishment of orphanages were at his core interest.

He served such parishes as Holy Rosary in St. Marys and St. Joseph's in Wapakoneta, both in Auglaize County, and he aided in establishing Immaculate Conception parish in Celina in Mercer County.  In 1875, he erected an orphan asylum and a trade school for boys at Lafayette. He was a zealous promoter of the parochial school system.

In 1884 he attended the Third Plenary Council at Baltimore. The following March he was deputed, with Bishops John Moore and Richard Gilmour, to present the decrees of the council to Pope Leo XIII. In 1886, he erected an asylum for orphan girls at Fort Wayne. In 1888 when he was on his way to Rome he visited the German Motherhouse of the congregation of the Poor Handmaids of Jesus Christ in Dernbach Westerwald from where their community took its beginnings. He stated his intention as to express personally his gratitude for the many services which had been done for the development of his diocese and the many sisters which had been sent to serve in the US. As in 1888, in 1891 he again went to Rome, the last time in the interest of the Pontifical North American College.

Death and legacy 
Joseph Dwenger died on January 22, 1893, in Fort Wayne. He was buried at the Cathedral of the Immaculate Conception in Fort Wayne. Bishop Dwenger High School in Fort Wayne is named for him.

References

This article incorporates text from the 1909 Catholic Encyclopedia article "Fort Wayne" by Bonaventure Hammer, a publication now in the public domain.

1837 births
1893 deaths
People from Mercer County, Ohio
Roman Catholic Archdiocese of Cincinnati
19th-century Roman Catholic bishops in the United States
Roman Catholic bishops of Fort Wayne
People from Auglaize County, Ohio
Catholics from Ohio
Catholics from Indiana